Glickman is a surname. Notable people with the surname include:

Dan Glickman (born 1944), American politician
Dov Glickman, Israeli actor
Golda Glickman, better known as Roxana Sand or Roxanne Carmine, erotic dancer and fan dancer
Harry Glickman (1924-2020), founder of the National Basketball Association's Portland Trail Blazers
Irving Glickman (1914–1972), American periodontist
Jonathan Glickman (born 1969), American film producer
Kevon Glickman (born 1960), American music producer and entertainment lawyer
Lawrence B. Glickman (born 1963), American historian
Marty Glickman (1917–2001), American track and field athlete and sports announcer
Mort Glickman (1898–1953), American composer
Stephen H. Glickman (born 1948), American judge
Stephen Kramer Glickman (born 1979), American actor
Susan Glickman (born 1953), Canadian writer and critic
Sylvia Glickman, composer
Todd Glickman (born 1956), American meteorologist
Will Glickman (1910–1983), American playwright

See also
Loretta Thompson-Glickman (1945–2001), American politician
Max Gluckman (1911–1975), South African social anthropologist 

Jewish surnames